The 1906 Cork Senior Hurling Championship was the 19th staging of the Cork Senior Hurling Championship since its establishment by the Cork County Board in 1887.

St. Finbarr’s were the defending champions from 1903 because the 1905 championship wasn’t completed.

St. Finbarr’s won the championship following a 2-9 to 0-6 defeat of Ballymartle in the final. As a result of this victory they were also awarded the 1905 championship title. Consequently, this was their fourth championship title overall and their third title in succession.

Results

Final

Championship statistics

Miscellaneous

 St. Finbarr’s become the second team after Blackrock in 1895 to win three successive championship titles.
 Ballymartle qualify for the final for the first time.

References

Cork Senior Hurling Championship
Cork Senior Hurling Championship